The 2022–23 Arema F.C. season is Arema's 33rd competitive season. The club will compete in Indonesia League 1. Arema Football Club a professional football club based in Malang, East Java, Indonesia.

Squad information

First team squad

Transfers

In

Out

Loan Out

Review and events
This season will be the second season for the coach Eduardo Almeida and his contract extended for two years. Last season under the led of Almeida, Arema finished in the 4th and experienced unbeaten for 23 matches.

The first official training held in 10 May 2022 at Brawijaya University football field. Aremania, the supporter of Arema, crowded the second official training at Gajayana Stadium which is the first training attended by the fans since COVID-19 pandemic. The team launching was held on 20 July 2022 at Gajayana Stadium after winning Indonesia President's Cup three days earlier. Arema new training ground construction in Kedungkandang, Malang began in this season after the design contest was held.

On 5 September 2022, Eduardo Almeida was sacked from coaching the club after earning 3 wins, 2 draws and 3 defeats in the league and replaced as caretaker by assistant coach Kuncoro. One days later, Javier Roca was appointed as new head coach to replace Eduardo Almeida.

On 1 October 2022, In the match which was Super East Java Derby between Arema and Persebaya Surabaya there was a disaster after the match. As a result of the disaster, all leagues matches were suspended for weeks. Besides that, Arema was officially banned from using Kanjuruhan Stadium in home matches and cannot be attended by spectators until the end of the season.

On 6 February 2023, Arema officially ended his collaboration with Javier Roca as coach after having bad results with 5 consecutive defeats. I Putu Gede replaced Javier Roca as caretaker. On 9 March 2023, Arema officially appointed Joko Susilo as head coach to replace I Putu Gede.

Pre-seasons and friendlies

Friendlies

Indonesian's President Cup

Group stage

Knockout phase

Trofeo Ronaldinho

Match results

Liga 1

Matches

League table

Piala Indonesia

Statistics

Squad appearances and goals

|-
! colspan=14 style=background:#dcdcdc; text-align:center|Goalkeepers

|-
! colspan=14 style=background:#dcdcdc; text-align:center|Defenders

|-
! colspan=14 style=background:#dcdcdc; text-align:center|Midfielders

|-
! colspan=14 style=background:#dcdcdc; text-align:center|Forwards

|-
! colspan=14 style=background:#dcdcdc; text-align:center|Players transferred or loaned out during the season the club 

|}

Top scorers
The list is sorted by shirt number when total goals are equal.

See also 
 2022 Kanjuruhan Stadium disaster

References

External links 
 Arema F.C. Official website
 Arema F.C.'s Profile on Liga 1 Official Website  
 

Arema FC seasons
Indonesian football clubs 2022 season